BuBi (officially: MOL BuBi) is a bicycle sharing network in Budapest, Hungary. Its name is a playful contraction Budapest and Bicikli (bicycle in Hungarian), meaning "bubble" in an endearing manner. As of May 2019 the network consists of 143 docking stations and 1,846 bicycles.

History
The BuBi project was established in 2008 by the Municipality of Budapest.
The capital investment for this project takes up approx. 900 million HUF (around 3 million €). 85% of this amount is covered by the European Union, and the remaining 15% is paid by the local government.
Annual operating costs of est. 250 million HUF (around 800,000 €) are covered by MOL, the largest integrated oil and gas group, and runs a petrol station chain in Hungary – hence the name "MOL Bubi". Unlike basically everywhere else where nextbike's bicycle sharing system is implemented, which includes the hardware and the software and the bicycles, in Budapest it's not operated by nextbike. In Budapest it is operated by T-Systems and Csepel. Normally, in other implementations of nextbike's bicycle sharing system, the bicycles are assembled in nextbike's own production hall and delivered worldwide, in Budapest, however, the bicycles are produced / assembled by Csepel, a Hungarian bicycle manufacturer. Nevertheless, the bicycles in Budapest are identical to those in Warsaw, as well as to those in several other cities where the bike sharing scheme is created and operated by nextbike.

As of April 2014, the scheme was declared to be a first phase only. It is to be extended if it proves successful. According to János László, President of the Hungarian Cyclists' Club, a network size of 10,000 bicycles would suit the city's needs. In May 2015 the number of bicycles was 1100, and the number of docking stations was 76. In September 2016 the system was extended to 112 stations and 1270 bicycles. By December 2018 the number of stations grew to 127 with 1546 bikes and by May 2019 to 143 with 1846 bikes. A few docking stations are sponsored privately by operators of office buildings.

Network design
The MOL BuBi network consists of 143 docking stations, 1,846 bicycles and 24-hour technical support. The smaller number of docking stations on the Buda side is due to the hills which make cycling harder. The prevailing location of the docking stations can be found on this map.

The network is designed to minimize the risk of having both empty and full docking stations. In order to achieve this, the size of the stations varies with the expected volume. Furthermore, if a bicycle is to be docked in a full station, there are extra stands with non-physical docking capability to which the bicycles can be attached. Each bicycle is equipped with an additional lock which sends an alert to network operators if locked. Then operators can intervene and reallocate bicycles.

Both the size of the area covered and the fare system incentivize short, under-30-minutes runtimes. Therefore, bicycle dockings are expected to be frequent. In order to maintain smooth operation, network logistics is implemented by bicycle-transporting facilities of multiple sizes. The smallest unit can carry two bicycles on a trailer attached to an official bicycle, ensuring quick reallocation of bicycles.

Equipment

Dock terminals
BuBi users can pay the fares, buy BuBi passes and have deposits returned at the docking stations. The stations are equipped with batteries to supply the terminal and the docks with power, and the terminals are also fitted with solar panels. Each docking station features a surveillance camera to deter theft and vandalism.

Bicycles 
MOL Bubi bicycles are produced by Csepel. They are city bikes designed to resist weather and time. In order to prevent theft and vandalism, they are made of irremovable parts which are incompatible with other bicycles.

To satisfy urban cyclists' needs, bicycles are designed to provide their riders with comfort. Each bike is equipped with a front rack with elastic straps for packages, mudguards, chain guards and coat protectors covering the back wheel. They also feature hard wearing puncture-proof tyres.

Fares
The fee of using MOL Bubi consists of two distinct parts: the access fee and the usage fee. Users also have to leave a deposit of 25,000 HUF at the beginning of their lending period, which is refunded when the bicycle is returned. Planned fares as of May 2014 are summed up in the tables below. Prevailing fares can be found on this webpage.

See also 
 Bicycle sharing system
 BKK
 BKV Zrt.
 Nextbike
 Public transport
 Veturilo — the nextbike system in Warsaw
 List of bicycle sharing systems

References

External links

History of Csepel bicycle manufacturing company
 Veturilo - nextbike in Warsaw 
T-System's press release (in Hungarian) about the MOL Bubi Project
 TeleBike in Budapest (nextbike's BusinessBike solution for T-System, purchased and installed in spring 2013)
nextbike in Glasgow
T-System's announcement that MOL Bubi bicycles can be rented by smart phones (as of December 2014)

Community bicycle programs
Transport in Budapest
Bicycle sharing in Hungary